Liberty Seguros is an international subsidiary of Liberty Mutual Group, a Boston-based insurance company.

Sponsorships

Liberty Seguros sponsored the UCI ProTour cycling team, Liberty Seguros – Würth, but dropped the sponsorship on 25 May 2006 due to the Operación Puerto doping case, involving the team manager Manolo Saiz. They also sponsored a smaller continental cycling team based in Portugal, but dropped the sponsorship for this also in September 2009, when three members of the team failed drugs tests simultaneously.

Liberty Seguros in Brazil was a sponsor of the 2014 FIFA World Cup.

References

External links

 
 
 

Financial services companies established in 2001
Insurance companies of Spain
Insurance companies of Portugal
Insurance companies of Brazil
Liberty Mutual